Hypatopa edax is a moth in the family Blastobasidae. It is found in Costa Rica.

The length of the forewings is 4–4.2 mm. The forewings are pale brown intermixed with pale greyish-brown scales and brown scales. The hindwings are translucent brown, gradually darkening towards the apex.

Etymology
The specific name is derived from Latin edax (meaning greedy).

References

Moths described in 2013
Hypatopa